Harbottle Grimston may refer to:
 Sir Harbottle Grimston, 1st Baronet (c. 1569–1648), MP
 Sir Harbottle Grimston, 2nd Baronet (1603–1685), MP

See also
Grimston baronets
Grimston (disambiguation)